The Donegal Intermediate Ladies Football Championship is an annual LGFA competition organised by Donegal LGFA among the intermediate ladies football clubs in County Donegal.

The winner qualifies to represent the county in the Ulster Intermediate Club Ladies Football Championship, the winner of which progresses to the All-Ireland Intermediate Ladies Club Football Championship. The winning team receives the intermediate championship trophy. As of 2021, this trophy was unnamed.

Aodh Ruadh are the 2022 champions. Aodh Ruadh are the most successful club, with three titles.

Winners and finalists

Results by team

Finals listed by year

References

Explanatory notes

External links
 Official Donegal Website
 Donegal on Hoganstand
 Donegal Club GAA

Donegal GAA club championships